Singing in the Suburbs is the first solo live album by Australian country music artist John Williamson. The album was released in 1983. The album included the track "The Vasectomy Song", which peaked at number 28 on the Kent Music Report, which remains Williamson's second highest-charting single, behind "Old Man Emu".

The album was re-released in 1996 under the title John Williamson Live and again in 2000 under the title Waltzing Matilda: John Williamson Live .

Track listing

Release history

References

1983 live albums
Live albums by Australian artists
Festival Records live albums
John Williamson (singer) albums